CROCUS is a research reactor at École Polytechnique Fédérale de Lausanne, a research institute and university in Lausanne, Switzerland.

The aluminum vessel is filled with demineralized light water to serve as both a neutron moderator and a neutron reflector.

Power output is controlled either by adjusting the water level in the reactor—with a ± level of control, or with the adjustment of two boron carbide (BC) control rods—with a ± level of finesse.  The reactor has six separate safety systems: two cadmium shields and four storage tanks, any of which can shut down the reaction in less than a second.

CROCUS has a license to produce  or a neutron flux of ~2.5 × 10 cms at the core's center.

References

See also
 

École Polytechnique Fédérale de Lausanne
nuclear research reactors